Events in the year 1966 in Ireland.

Incumbents
 President: Éamon de Valera
 Taoiseach:
 Seán Lemass (FF) (until 10 November 1966)
 Jack Lynch (FF) (from 10 November 1966)
 Tánaiste: Frank Aiken (FF)
 Minister for Finance:
 Jack Lynch (FF) (until 10 November 1966)
 Charles Haughey (FF) (from 10 November 1966)
 Chief Justice: Cearbhall Ó Dálaigh 
 Dáil: 18th
 Seanad: 11th

Events
 13 February – The Bishop of Clonfert protested against the content of The Late Late Show by taking exception to an audience member telling host Gay Byrne that she wore nothing on her wedding night.
 6 March – A memorial was opened at Kilmichael, County Cork, to commemorate the 1920 ambush there.
 8 March
 Nelson's Pillar in O'Connell Street, Dublin, was clandestinely blown up, probably by former Irish Republican Army volunteers marking this year's 50th anniversary of the Easter Rising.
 The Broadcasting Authority (Amendment) Act changed the name of the national broadcasting authority from Radio Éireann to Radio Telefís Éireann.
 31 March – The tricolour flag flown over the General Post Office in Dublin in 1916 was returned by the British to Taoiseach Seán Lemass in London.
 6 April – The re-established Ulster Volunteer Force launched its campaign in Belfast.
 10 April – Celebrations took place to mark the 50th anniversary of the Easter Rising in 1916. Nine hundred survivors of the rising heard the reading of the Proclamation of the Irish Republic and President Éamon de Valera took the salute at a military parade.
 11 April – De Valera opened the Garden of Remembrance in Dublin's Parnell Square.
 15 April – Construction of Ireland's first high-rise flats began in Ballymun, Dublin.
 17 April – The Easter Rising was commemorated in Belfast by large Republican parades.
 2 June – De Valera was re-elected president. He defeated Tom O'Higgins by 10,500, less than one percent of the vote.
 25 June – De Valera was inaugurated for a second term.
 7 July – The Minister for Education, Donogh O'Malley, announced details of his free secondary education scheme.
 21 September – Allied Irish Banks was founded by the amalgamation of the Munster and Leinster Bank, Provincial Bank of Ireland, and Royal Bank of Ireland.
 21 October – An anti-apartheid demonstration took place outside the national stadium during a visit by the South African Amateur Boxing Team.
 8 November – Tributes were paid to Seán Lemass who announced his resignation as Taoiseach.
 10 November – The new taoiseach, Jack Lynch, and his ministers received their seals of office from President de Valera at the president's residence, Áras an Uachtaráin.
 25 November – The body of the second President of Ireland, Seán T. O'Kelly, lay in state at St. Mary's Pro-Cathedral.
 December – The first Quinnsworth supermarket was opened by Pat Quinn at Stillorgan in Dublin.
 Undated – The Ballintubber Abbey nave was restored and re-roofed.

Arts and literature
 28 February – The first English-language production of Samuel Beckett's Come and Go took place at the Peacock Theatre, Dublin. It was first produced on 14 January in German, in Berlin; it was also first published, in French, this year.
 18 July – The new Abbey Theatre in Dublin opened exactly 15 years after the original was burned down; the architect was former actor Michael Scott.
 October – The first annual Castlebar Song Contest was staged in Castlebar, County Mayo.
 Seamus Heaney's first poetry collection, Death of a Naturalist, was published.
 Aidan Higgins's novel Langrishe, Go Down was published.

Births
 24 January – Jimeoin, comedian, actor, producer and screenwriter.
 25 January – Donal MacIntyre, investigative journalist.
 8 February – Seán McCarthy, Cork hurler.
 14 February – Gary Halpin, international rugby union player (died 2021).
 12 April – Jim Duffy, historian and political commentator.
 23 April – Jim Stynes, Australian rules football player (died 2012).
 3 May – Ducksy Walsh, handball player (died 2016).
 15 May – Orla Guerin, television journalist.
 22 May – Colm Ó Snodaigh, singer and musician with Kíla, and writer.
 9 June – Beverley Flynn, Fianna Fáil Teachta Dála (TD) for Mayo.
 2 August – Grainne Leahy, Irish cricketer.
 22 August – Alain Rolland, rugby player, international referee.
 6 October – Niall Quinn, international footballer.
 8 October – Mick Galwey, Gaelic footballer and rugby player.
 November – David Drumm, banker and convicted fraudster.
 11 November – Alison Doody, actress.
 21 November – Martin Hanamy, Offaly hurler.
 30 November – Lenny Abrahamson, film director.
 7 December – Leo Turley, Laois Gaelic footballer.
 8 December – Sinéad O'Connor, singer and songwriter.
 10 December – Colm Ó Maonlaí, actor and musician.
 12 December – Pat Shortt, actor.
 16 December – Paul McGinley, golfer.

 Full date unknown
 Rachel Joynt, sculptor.
 John Power, Kilkenny hurler.
 Liam Simpson, Kilkenny hurler.

Deaths
 10 March – Frank O'Connor, short story writer and memoirist (born 1903).
 26 March – Joseph McGrath, Sinn Féin party and later Cumann na nGaedheal party TD, racehorse owner and breeder (born 1888).
 28 March – Patrick McCartan, Sinn Féin member of parliament (MP) and TD, member of the First Dáil, founder member of Clann na Poblachta (born 1878).
 1 April – Brian O'Nolan, satirist and humourist (born 1911).
 29 April – Tom Hales, Irish Republican Army volunteer, fought in Anglo-Irish War and Irish Civil War (born 1892).
 23 May – Jacko Heaslip, cricketer (born 1899).
 3 June – Fionán Lynch, Sinn Féin MP and TD, member of the First Dáil, Cabinet minister, Cumann na nGaedheal and Fine Gael party TD (born 1889).
 7 June – James Hickey, Labour Party politician and Lord Mayor of Cork.
 26 July – Maura Laverty, writer (born 1907).
 12 August – Mike McTigue, boxer, light heavyweight champion of the world 1923–1925 (born 1892).
 23 November – Seán T. O'Kelly, founding member of Fianna Fáil, Cabinet minister and second President of Ireland (born 1882).
 14 December – Paul Galligan, merchant, member of the First Dáil representing Cavan West (born 1888).
 15 December – Conn Ward, Fianna Fáil politician (born 1890).
 25 December – Thomas Harvey, cricketer and rugby player (born 1878).
 27 December – Sim Walton, hurler (Tullaroan, Kilkenny) (born 1870).
 31 December – Danny Ryan, hurler (Moycarkey-Borris, Kilkenny) (born 1880).

Full date unknown
 Diarmuid Murphy, writer, theatre and film producer (born 1895).
 Sydney Sparkes Orr, Professor of Philosophy at the University of Tasmania (born 1914).

See also 
 1966 in Irish television

References 

 
1960s in Ireland
Ireland
Years of the 20th century in Ireland